Lanigan's Rabbi is an American crime drama series that aired on NBC from January 30 to April 24, 1977.

Synopsis

Based upon a series of novels by Harry Kemelman, the series stars Art Carney as Police Chief Paul Lanigan, who fights crime in a small California town with the help of his best friend, Rabbi David Small (Stuart Margolin in the pilot, Bruce Solomon in the series). Small's ability in this area was attributed to his "rabbinic mind", and his Talmudic training. However, an added element for the David Small novels and the Lanigan's Rabbi series was that Small was usually trying to balance his crime-solving assistance to Chief Lanigan with synagogue politics, usually involving some congregants who would be happy to see the rabbi lose his position. Co-starring in the series was Janis Paige and Janet Margolin as Mrs. Lanigan and Mrs. Small, respectively. Another regular on the series was Carney's daughter, Barbara Carney.

After a successful pilot film based on Friday the Rabbi Slept Late, the first novel in the Rabbi David Small series, aired in 1976, Lanigan's Rabbi was produced as a series of 90-minute telefilms beginning in January 1977. For the series, Bruce Solomon replaced Stuart Margolin, who had played Rabbi Small in the pilot; the unrelated Janet Margolin played his wife. The series was broadcast on a rotating schedule under the umbrella title NBC Sunday Mystery Movie. Other series involved in the scheme were Columbo, McCloud, and McMillan (formerly McMillan & Wife). Lanigan's Rabbi was the last series added to the Mystery Movie format (it replaced Quincy, M.E. at mid-season when that series was spun off into a weekly program); in the spring, NBC cancelled all four series and discontinued the Mystery Movie format. As a result, only four Lanigan's Rabbi episodes were broadcast.

Cast
 Art Carney - Chief Paul Lanigan
 Stuart Margolin - Rabbi David Small (pilot)
 Bruce Solomon - Rabbi David Small
 Barbara Carney - Bobbie Whittaker
 Janet Margolin - Miriam Small
 Janis Paige - Kate Lanigan
 Reva Rose - Hannan Prince

Episode list

External links
 
 

NBC original programming
1970s American crime drama television series
Television series by Universal Television
American detective television series
NBC Mystery Movie
1976 American television series debuts
1977 American television series endings
Television shows based on American novels
English-language television shows
Religious drama television series
Television series about Jews and Judaism
Television shows set in California